Venning is a surname. Notable people with the surname include:

 Annabel Venning (born 1973), British author and journalist
 Dorothy Venning (1885–1942), British artist
 Ivan Venning, Australian politician
 John Venning (1776–1858), English merchant and prison reformer
 Ralph Venning ( 1621–1673 or 1674), English nonconformist Christian
 Walter Venning (1882–1964), British army officer and administrator
 Walter Venning (philanthropist) (1781–1821), English merchant and philanthropist